Kilunda Rugby Football Club, also known as Kilunda or Masaku RFC, is a Kenyan rugby union club based in Machakos. For the 2015-16 season the club competes in the Nairobi region of the Nationwide League.

History
The club was founded in the 1960s with the aim of promoting rugby in Machakos. However, over time, due to lack of commitment and exposure, the team fizzled away, only to be "re-emerge" in 2012 at the Masaku Sevens. The inaugural Rugby sevens tournament was held at the Machakos Golf Club. The Masaku Sevens offers an ideal platform for local area rugby players to work harder and sharpen their rugby experience. It also provides an opportunity to help the local people appreciate and get to love rugby.

References

Kenyan rugby union teams
Machakos County